Queen Victoria has been the name of several ships:
 , a wooden paddlewheel steamer that was wrecked in 1853 off Bailey Lighthouse, Howth, with the loss of over 80 people
 , originally sailed as TS Queen Victoria from 1933 to 1935
 , according to shipping legend, initially supposed to be called Victoria in line with the naming of Cunard's liners, with an ending in -ia, as with Lusitania, Mauretania
 , a cruise liner which was intended to be Queen Victoria for Cunard Line
 , a ship of similar design and specifications to Arcadia that was completed and named in 2007 for Cunard Line

A number of other ships have been named simply Victoria:
  of Liverpool, lost 1864
 , the first ship to circumnavigate the globe
 , a Spanish frigate
 , five ships of the British Royal Navy
 , a ferry which sank disastrously in 1953
 , a Lake Victoria ferry built in Glasgow and reassembled in East Africa.
 Victoria-class submarine, a class of Canadian submarine
 MV Victoria, a P&O cruise ship operated between 1998 and 2002, now named 
 , a cruiseferry belonging to Tallink
 , a ferry operated by Sessan Linjen and Stena Line  1981–1988, now sailing as MS Stena Europe
 , a ferry operated by Stena Line in 1990, now sailing as MS Amusement World
 , a Liberian-flagship bringing Iranian weapons to Gaza.

See also
 Victoria (disambiguation)

Ship names